County Roscommon was a constituency represented in the Irish House of Commons from 1611 to 1800.

Members of Parliament
1585 Sir Richard Bingham and Thomas Dillon
1613–1615 Sir John King and Sir Oliver St John
1634–1635 Sir Lucas Dillon
1639–1649 Sir Lucas Dillon and Henry (or Geoffrey) Dillon and Robert King
1654 (Protectorate Parliament) Sir Robert King
1657 (Protectorate Parliament) James King
1661 April–December Sir Charles Coote (replaced 1662 by George Lane) and Richard Jones.

1689–1801

Notes

References

Historic constituencies in County Roscommon
Constituencies of the Parliament of Ireland (pre-1801)
1611 establishments in Ireland
1800 disestablishments in Ireland
Constituencies established in 1611
Constituencies disestablished in 1800